Bahrain Telecommunication Company BSC, trading as Batelco, is the principal telecommunications company in Bahrain. The company's headquarters are in Bahrain and the company is listed on the Bahrain Bourse. The Chairman of the Board is Abdulla Bin Khalifa Al Khalifa.

It provides services for mobiles through UMTS 2100 and LTE 1800 (the GSM network was shut down on 31 December 2019) while its residential Internet is an ADSL, Wireless (4G/5G) or FTTH service. Batelco is one of Bahrain's five Internet service providers.

Ownership

Batelco was established in 1981 as a Bahraini public joint stock company and has an authorized share capital of BD200 million (US$531 million).

Batelco's major shareholders include Orascom Investment Holding (60%) and the Government of Bahrain (through Mumtalakat Holding Company, Amber Holding Company and Social Insurance Organisation; 40%), various financial and commercial organizations, and private Bahraini, Gulf Cooperation Council countries (GCC) and international investors.

Employees
Batelco employs approximately 936 people in Bahrain. Mikkel Vinter is the current chief executive officer of Batelco.

Mergers and acquisitions
1998: 44% of Qualitynet was acquired by Batelco in a public offering by Kuwait's Ministry of Communication, as part of a strategy to privatise Internet and data communications services within the State of Kuwait.
2001: Batelco Jordan was formed following the merger of National Equipment Telecommunications Systems (NETS) and First Telecommunications Group (FTG) with Batelco.
2003: Batelco Egypt Communications (S.A.E.) was established as a wholly owned subsidiary of Batelco Middle East, in Cairo as an Egyptian Joint Stock Closed Company.
2006: Batelco purchases 96% share of Umniah Mobile Communications – Jordan.
2007: Batelco purchased a 20% stake in Yemen's SabaFon mobile communications company, for US$144 million in cash.
2008: Consortiums led by Batelco, Hong Kong's PCCW and U.S. Verizon Communications won final approval to operate a new Saudi fixed-line phone network called Etihad Atheeb Telecom Company. Etihad Atheeb has since gone public in February 2009, offering 30 million shares at SAR 10 per share (US$2.67) representing 30% of its capital in an IPO; which was 2.5 times oversubscribed.  The IPO raised US$80 million.
 Batelco Group offers to purchase the remaining 20 percent shares not already held by the Group in Batelco Jordan, for a total consideration of JD2.126 million ($3m). Through its 96 percent-owned subsidiary Umniah Mobile Communications, Batelco made the offer to all Batelco Jordan shareholders, valuing the company at JD10.629 million.

2009: Batelco partnered with Millennium Private Equity to form Batelco Millennium India Company Limited (BMICL) to purchase 49% stake in Chennai based S Tel Limited, a recently established Indian mobile operator, for US$225 million.
2012: Batelco announced its agreement for the sale of its shareholding (42.7% equity) in S Tel Private Limited (STel) to its Indian partner, Sky City Foundation Limited for BD 65.8M (US$174.5M).
2013: Batelco announced the acquisition of Cable & Wireless Communications' (CWC) interest in Dhiraagu (Maldives), Sure Channel Islands and Isle of Man and CWC operations in Falkland Islands, St Helena, Ascension and Diego Garcia (“SADG”). Total consideration paid for these assets was $570M.
2014: Batelco Group acquired Ali Alghanim & Sons General Trading and Contracting Company W.L.L. (the “Alghanims”) 46% shareholding in Quality Net.
2019: Batelco sold its 90% shareholding in QualityNet to Viva Kuwait (part of stc). Batelco also created a new division called BNET, which provides broadband network services to all licensed operators including Batelco. Whereas, Batelco remained focused solely on retail and corporate operations.

See also
Telecommunications in Bahrain

References

External links 

 

Telecommunications companies established in 1981
Telecommunications companies of Bahrain
Companies listed on the Bahrain Bourse
Bahraini companies established in 1981